Udoji ki Baori is a stepwell situated in the village of Mandholi in the Indian state of Rajasthan.

Overview 
Mandholi is a village in the Sikar district of Rajasthan state in India. It is situated 90 km to the north of Jaipur.

It is located opposite Sati Mata Temple and was constructed around AD 1500.

References

External links 
Chand Baori Abhaneri
Buildings and structures completed in the 16th century
Stepwells in Rajasthan
Tourist attractions in Sikar district